Karpatiosorbus admonitor, previously classified as Sorbus admonitor and also called the no parking whitebeam, is a species of whitebeam tree found in Devon, United Kingdom. It is known only from the Watersmeet Valley at Lynton, with two stray plants growing on the coast above Sillery Sands, Countisbury.

Discovery 
Its unusual name derives from the location of the first tree to be found (not the type specimen) – by a lay-by near Watersmeet in North Devon, with a "no parking" sign nailed to the tree. Although first recognised as a distinct variety in the 1930s (by the botanist E. F. Warburg) because of its strongly lobed leaves, it was only accorded species status in 2009, after various biochemical analyses. It is believed at least 110 individuals of the species exist and represent a stable population. The leaves of the no parking whitebeam have more accentuated lobes than the Devon whitebeam, of which it was thought before to be a variety.

The research project that named the tree as a species was led by Dr Tim Rich, head of vascular plants at the National Museum Wales, as well as academics from Bristol University, Exeter University, Oxford University and the Royal Botanic Gardens, Kew. The announcement of the species, and of thirteen other Sorbus species, was made in two papers in the BSBI's journal Watsonia.

Dr Rich stated that the trees, along with other new whitebeam species, had "probably developed recently", and also considered them as "examples of on-going evolution of new species".

In 2017 Kurtto and Sennikov assigned many whitebeam species, including the no-parking whitebeam, to a new genus Karpatiosorbus. Members of Karpatiosorbus are hybrids of two divergent Malinae taxa that were previously all considered to part of the genus Sorbus.

Details
The holotype is a large tree above scree at Watersmeet in Vice-county 4, North Devon, Grid Ref ; the material studied was collected on 10 October 2007. It is a member of the Karpatiosorbus latifolia group.

It is similar to Karpatiosorbus devoniensis, but differing in having leaves more deeply lobed, 10–23% of the way to the midrib at the centre of the lamina – not 6–18% as in K. devoniensis; the leaves of K. admonitor are also glossier than those of K. devoniensis.

It is endemic to the Watersmeet area, where there are at least 108 trees in the East Lyn Valley and two trees nearby above Sillery Sands, Lynmouth. K. devoniensis does not grow in this area. The two species have not been confirmed as growing together.

A chromosome count showed that the species is tetraploid.

As a result of its small range, which is largely confined to North Devon, it has an IUCN conservation assessment of Endangered. However, its population trend is stable, and ex-situ conservation measures are in place. In addition, the majority of K. admonitor's range exists in protected areas.

References

admonitor
Plants described in 2009
Endemic flora of England
Taxobox binomials not recognized by IUCN